17 Cygni is the Flamsteed designation for a multiple star system in the northern constellation of Cygnus. It has an apparent visual magnitude of 5.00, so, according to the Bortle scale, it is visible from suburban skies at night. It has a relatively high proper motion, traversing the celestial sphere at the rate of /year.

This system consists of two visual binary systems that were discovered by John Herschel in the 1820s. Components A and B form a bright, wide pair with an angular separation of 26.0 arcsecond and an estimated orbital period of ~6,200 years. The faint, close system consists of components F and G with a separation of 2.6 arcsecond and a period of 238 years. The two binaries form a hierarchical system with a separation of about 800 arcseconds and orbital period of 3.7 million years or more. At an angular separation of 791.40 arcseconds is a proper motion companion with a classification of M0.4, indicating this is a red dwarf star. At the estimated distance of the pair, this is equal to a projected separation of 16,320 AU. Although the CCDM lists four other companions, these are not associated with the system.

The stellar classification of the primary star, component A, is F7 V, which means it is a main sequence star like the Sun. The star has 1.24 times the mass of the Sun and 1.54 times the Sun's radius. It is some 2.8 billion years old and shines with 3.66 times the Sun's luminosity. The effective temperature of the stellar atmosphere is 6,455 K, giving it the yellow-white hued glow of an F-type star.

References

F-type main-sequence stars
M-type main-sequence stars
Binary stars
Cygnus (constellation)
7534
Durchmusterung objects
Cygni, 17
9670
097295
187013